After the departure of lead singer Chris Batstone, Suburban Legends re-released their first EP, Suburban Legends, by removing the vocal track featuring Chris, and replacing it with a vocal track of new lead singer, Tim Maurer. Suburban Legends (Tim Remix) is essentially the same album from the Orange County based ska punk band. It was first released in 2002 in Los Angeles, California by We the People Records. Its first pressing came with a green cover which was later changed to an orange cover. The green cover version is now very hard to find. The music, however, is the same on both editions. The main difference between the two versions is that the green cover edition was released by We the People Records, while the orange cover edition was self-released by the band at the end of the year. As of 2012, both versions are out of print.

Music
The instrumentals of the EP are exactly the same as the older version with Chris Batstone on vocals, except for "Don Juan" having its intro removed. The only other changes were made to the vocal tracks. Tim Maurer, having rejoined the band as vocalist, replaced the lead vocal track on all songs except Desperate. He also recorded most of the backing vocals, adding more harmony vocals compared to Chris Batstone's version. Trumpet player Aaron Bertram had recorded most of the backing vocals on the previous version of the EP, but would still do the backing vocals live.
Tim and Chris' versions have been compared by fans, who consider Chris' version to be more energetic with his powerful singing voice, while Tim's voice has been regarded as more melodious with his emotional interpretations.

On the final track, "Desperate," Vincent Walker replaces Chris Batstone's vocal track, making it another duet between him and Brian Klemm. Even though Brian Klemm also sung half of the original song, he re-recorded his vocal track for this release. During live performances of the song, Vincent Walker takes over the guitar from Brian Klemm in the second half of the song. When Tim Maurer was still the band's vocalist, he would sometimes take over Vincent's vocals of the second half.

Tracks 3 and 4, Don Juan and Alternative is Dead, had both been previously released on Suburban Legends' demo album Origin Edition and were co-written by the band's bassist at the time, Justin Meacham. Alternative is Dead was also one of the first tracks the band had written and was on the band's first demo, the Bomb Squad EP. All of these older versions featured Tim Maurer on vocals as well.

Track listing

Personnel
Tim Maurer – Vocals
Vince Walker – Trumpet, Lead vocals on "Desperate", Backing vocals
Aaron Bertram – Trumpet, Backing vocals
Brian Robertson – Trombone
Dallas Cook – Trombone
Brian Klemm – Lead guitar, Lead vocals on "Desperate"
Chris Maurer – Bass guitar 
Derek Lee Rock – drums

Additional musicians
Chris Colonier
Ryland Steen
Shawn Sullivan

Suburban Legends albums
2002 albums
Albums produced by John Avila